Timothy John Crow  is a British psychiatrist and researcher from Oxford. Much of his research is related to the causes of schizophrenia. He also has an interest in neurology and the evolutionary theory. He is the Honorary Director of the Prince of Wales International Centre for Research into Schizophrenia and Depression. He qualified at the Royal London Hospital in 1964 and obtained a PhD at the University of Aberdeen, Scotland, in 1970. He is a fellow of the Royal Colleges of Physicians and Psychiatrists and the Academy of Medical Sciences. Crow was for twenty years Head of the Division of Psychiatry of the Medical Research Council (MRC) Clinical Research Centre at Northwick Park Hospital and then a member of the External Scientific staff of the MRC in Oxford.

Research

Psychosis and schizophrenia 
Crow's long term research interests are in the nature and causation of the major psychoses. These illnesses are characterised by the presence of delusions, hallucinations, and disorders of thinking that are generally onset in early and middle adult life. Encompassing schizophrenia and manic-depressive psychosis, these disorders are common, affecting around 2% of the population in the course of a lifetime.

In the first CT scan study in 1976 Crow and colleagues at Northwick Park demonstrated that there are structural changes (e.g. a degree of enlargement of the cerebral ventricles) in individuals who have suffered from schizophrenia. Much subsequent work with MRI scans and in post-mortem brain studies has confirmed this and suggests that the changes are in the cerebral cortex and particularly are related to the subtle asymmetries that are characteristic of the human cortex. Through various experiments and observation, Crow has also proven that people with Schizophrenia show less left-sided dominance for language.

In the 1980s, Crow published an article that became a breakthrough in the field of research on schizophrenia. Crow focused on the classification of the symptoms of the disease instead of focusing on patients. Crow later introduced two syndromes of schizophrenia, one that is based on positive symptoms and the other on negative symptoms.

See also
LRRTM1, a gene linked to handedness and psychotic disorders

References

External links
Professor Tim Crow, on the Prince of Wales International Centre for SANE Research Website
Audio interview with Professor Tim Crow, by Basque journalist Edu Lartzanguren (2006)

Living people
Year of birth missing (living people)
British psychiatrists
People educated at Shrewsbury School
Alumni of the London Hospital Medical College
Fellows of the Academy of Medical Sciences (United Kingdom)
Schizophrenia researchers
Officers of the Order of the British Empire